The following is a list of Lexus vehicles, including past and present production models, as well as concept vehicles and limited editions.  Model generations are ordered by year of introduction. This list dates back to the start of production in 1989 for the 1990 model year, when Lexus was founded as the luxury division of Toyota. Vehicle designations on production vehicles indicate class and powertrain size.

Production models

Current models

Model year introductions
 CT: compact FWD
 2011 Lexus CT 200h
 IS: compact RWD/AWD
 2000 Lexus IS 200/IS 300
 2006 Lexus IS 250/IS 250 AWD/IS 300/IS 350/IS 220d
 2008 Lexus IS F
 2010 Lexus IS 250 C/IS 300 C/IS 350 C/IS F
 2011 Lexus IS 220d
 2013 Lexus IS 250/IS 350/IS 300h 
 2015 Lexus IS 200t
 2017 Lexus IS 250/IS 300/IS 350/IS 300h
 2021 Lexus IS 500 F Sport Performance
 HS: compact FWD
 2010 Lexus HS 250h
 ES: midsize FWD
 1990 Lexus ES 250
 1992 Lexus ES 300
 1997 Lexus ES 300
 2004 Lexus ES 330
 2007 Lexus ES 350
 2010 Lexus ES 240
 2013 Lexus ES 250/ES 300h/ES 350
 2015 Lexus ES 200/ES 250/ES 300h/ES 350
 2018 Lexus ES 200/ES 250/ES 260/ES 300h/ES 350
 GS: midsize RWD/AWD
 1993 Lexus GS 300
 1998 Lexus GS 300/GS 400
 2001 Lexus GS 430
 2006 Lexus GS 300/GS 300 AWD/GS 430/GS 450h
 2008 Lexus GS 350/GS 350 AWD/GS 460
 2013 Lexus GS 250/GS 350/GS 350 AWD/GS 450h
 2015 Lexus GS 200t/GS 250/GS 350/GS 350 AWD/GS 450h/GS F
 LS: full-size RWD/AWD
 1990 Lexus LS 400
 2001 Lexus LS 430
 2007 Lexus LS 460/LS 460 L
 2008 Lexus LS 600h/LS 600h L
 2009 Lexus LS 460/LS 460 AWD/LS 460 L/LS 460 L AWD
 2010 Lexus LS 460 SZ/Sport
 2013 Lexus LS 460/LS 460 AWD/LS 460 L/LS 460 L AWD/LS 600h L
 2017 Lexus LS 350/LS 500/LS 500h
 SC: coupé/coupé convertible RWD
 1992 Lexus SC 300/SC 400
 2002 Lexus SC 430
 2006 Lexus SC 430
 RC: coupé RWD/AWD
 2014 Lexus RC 300h/RC 350/RC F
 2016 Lexus RC 200t/RC 300
 LC: coupé RWD
 2016 Lexus LC 500/LC 500h
 LFA: exotic sports coupe RWD
 2011 Lexus LFA
 2012 Lexus LFA Nürburgring Package
 NX: compact crossover FWD/AWD
 2014 Lexus NX 200t/NX 300h
 2021 Lexus NX 250/NX 350/NX 350h/NX 450h+
 UX: subcompact luxury crossover FWD/AWD
 2018 Lexus UX 200/UX 250h
 2020 Lexus UX 300e
 RX: full-size crossover FWD/AWD
 1999 Lexus RX 300
 2004 Lexus RX 330
 2006 Lexus RX 400h
 2007 Lexus RX 350
 2010 Lexus RX 350/RX 450h
 2011 Lexus RX 270
 2013 Lexus RX 270/RX 350/RX 450h
 2015 Lexus RX 200t/RX 350/RX 450h
 2022 Lexus RX 350/RX 350h/RX 450h+/RX 500h F Sport
 GX: full-size sport utility vehicle AWD
 2003 Lexus GX 470
 2010 Lexus GX 460
 2012 Lexus GX 400
 LX: full-size sport utility vehicle AWD
 1997 Lexus LX 450
 1999 Lexus LX 470
 2008 Lexus LX 470/LX 570
 2013 Lexus LX 460/LX 570
 2016 Lexus LX 570
 2021 Lexus LX 600/LX 500d
 LM: minivan FWD / AWD
 2020 Lexus LM 350/LM 300h
 RZ: Battery electric luxury crossover AWD
 2023 Lexus RZ 450e

F Sport models
 CT F Sport
 2011 Lexus CT 200h F Sport
 2014 Lexus CT 200h F Sport
 IS F Sport
 2011 Lexus IS 250/350/200d/250 C/350 C F Sport
 2013 Lexus IS 250/300h/350 F Sport
 GS F Sport
 2013 Lexus GS 350 F Sport
 2013 Lexus GS 450h F Sport
 LS F Sport
 2013 Lexus LS 460 F Sport
 2013 Lexus LS 600h F Sport
 RX F Sport
 2013 Lexus RX 350 F Sport
 2013 Lexus RX 450h F Sport
 NX F Sport
 2014 Lexus NX 200t F Sport
 RC F Sport
 2014 Lexus RC 350 F Sport

Special editions

 CT: Compact Car
 2018 CT 200h Black Sequence
 IS: compact RWD/AWD
 2003 SportDesign IS 300
 2007 Limited Edition IS 250 X
 2007 Neiman Marcus Edition IS F
 2007 "Elegant White" IS 250/350
 2009 Special Edition IS 250 SR
 2009 "Red-edge Black" IS 250/350
 2009 "Blazing Terracotta" IS F
 2010 "X-Edition" IS 250
 2010 IS 350 C F Sport Special Edition
 2011 Stone Works "Sunrise" IS 250
 2018 IS 300 / IS 300h / IS 350 Black Sequence 
 2020 IS 300 / IS 300 AWD / IS 350 F-Sport Black Line Edition
 ES: midsize FWD
 1996 Coach Edition ES 300
 1999 Coach Edition ES 300
 2000 Platinum Edition ES 300
 2004 SportDesign ES 330
 2005 Black Diamond Edition ES 330
 2009 Pebble Beach Edition ES 350
 GS: midsize RWD/AWD

 2000 Platinum Series GS 300/400
 2001 SportDesign GS 300
 2007 Neiman Marcus Edition GS 450h
 2009 "Passionate Black" GS 350/460/450h
 2009 "Meteor Black" GS 350/460
 2011 Stone Works "Sunset" GS 350
 2018 GS 300/ GS 300h / GS 350 / GS 450h Black Sequence 
 LS: full-size RWD/AWD
 1997 Coach Edition LS 400
 2000 Platinum Series LS 400
 2007 Neiman Marcus Launch Edition LS 600h L
 2009 Pebble Beach Edition LS 600h L
 2020 LS 500 Inspiration Series
 SC: coupé/coupé convertible RWD
 2004 Pebble Beach Edition SC 430
 2005 Pebble Beach Edition SC 430
 2006 Pebble Beach Edition SC 430
 2007, 2008, 2009 Pebble Beach SC 430
 2010 "Eternal Jewel" SC 430
 LFA: exotic sports coupe RWD
 2012 LFA Special Edition
 LC: Coupe RWD
 2019 LC 500/LC500h Structural Blue 
 2019 LC 500 Raster Yellow 
 2019 LC 500/LC 500h Patina Elegance 
 2020 LC 500 Inspiration Series
 UX:subcompact Crossover
 2020 UX 200 Blue Edition
 2020 UX 250h Brown Edition
 NX: Compact Crossover
 2018 NX 300 / NX 300h Black Sequence 
 2020 NX 300 Black Line Edition
 2020 NX 300 Bronze Edition
 RX: midsize crossover SUV
 2001 SilverSport Special Edition RX 300
 2002 Coach Edition RX 300
 2005 Thundercloud Edition RX 330
 2009 Pebble Beach Edition RX 350
 2011 Stone Works "Sunlight" RX 350
 2018 RX 300 / RX 450h Black Sequence 
 LX: full-size sport utility vehicle
 2007 Limited Edition LX 470
 2015 LX 570 Supercharged 
 2018 LX 570 Black Sequence 
 2019 LX 570 Inspiration Series

Concept vehicles
 LF series concepts
 2003 LF-X: crossover
 2003 LF-S: luxury sedan
 2004 LF-C: convertible
 2005 LF-A: sports coupe
 2006 LF-Sh: hybrid luxury sedan
 2007 LF-Xh: hybrid crossover
 2008 LF-AR: roadster
 2009 LF-Ch: compact hybrid
 2011 LF-Gh: hybrid touring sedan
 2012 LF-LC: hybrid coupe
 2013 LF-NX: small crossover SUV
 2013 LF-C2: RC convertible
 2015 LF-SA: Compact car
 2015 LF-FC: fuel cell concept car
 2018 LF-1 Limitless: crossover SUV
 2021 LF-Z Electrified: electric crossover SUV
 Production-based concepts
 2003 Lexus IS 430 sports sedan
 2004 Carolina Herrera SC 430 CH
 2005 Milan Design Week "L-finesse" LF-A
 2006 Milan Design Week "Evolving Fiber" LS 460
 2007 Higashifuji Driving Simulator LS 460
 2007 Milan Design Week "Invisible Garden" LS 600h L
 2008 Milan Design Week "Elastic Diamond" LF-Xh
 2008 IS F Racing concept
 2009 LS 460 ITS-Safety Concept
 2009 Crystallised Wind LFA
 2010 IS F CCS Concept
 2010 CT Umbra
 2011 CT Racing concept
 2022 NX PHEV Offroad Concept
 Other concept vehicles
 1994 Italdesign Lexus Landau: hatchback
 1995 Lexus FLV: station wagon
 1997 Lexus Street Rod: roadster
 1997 Lexus SLV: sport luxury vehicle
 1997 Lexus HPS: sports sedan
 1999 Lexus Sports Coupe: convertible
 2003 Lexus HPX: crossover
 2009 Lexus HB: hybrid sports motorbike
 2016 Lexus UX: crossover
 2017 Lexus LS+: luxury sedan
 2019 Lexus LY-650 Yacht
 2021 Lexus ROV Concept: side-by-side
 2021 Lexus Electrified Sedan: sedan
 2021 Lexus Electrified SUV: crossover
 2021 Lexus Electrified Sport: sports car
 2021 Lexus BEV Sport Concept: sports coupe
 Number Série
 2002 Lexus 2054

Series generations

Cars

Lexus CT

Lexus IS

Lexus HS

Lexus ES

Lexus GS

Lexus LS

Lexus SC

Lexus RC

Lexus LC

Lexus LFA

SUVs

Lexus UX

Lexus NX

Lexus RX

Lexus GX

Lexus LX

Minivans

Lexus LM

Model nomenclature

Lexus production model names use the following capital letters:

S = Sedan or Sport
C = Coupe
T = Touring
X = SUV
M = MPV

Additional letters indicate powertrain type, or special category:

AWD = all-wheel drive
F = F-marque
L = Long wheelbase
d = diesel
h = hybrid
t = turbo

See also

Lexus F
Lexus LF
List of automobiles
List of Toyota engines
List of Toyota vehicles

References

External links

 Lexus.com - current U.S. lineup
 Lexus.eu - Europe model range
 Lexus.jp - Japan lineup

1
Lexus